Hartley is a historical village in the Central Tablelands region of New South Wales, Australia, within the City of Lithgow local government area, located approximately  west of the Sydney central business district. Hartley is located below the western escarpment of the Blue Mountains.

It was once a major administrative centre on the Great Western Highway. It has since fallen into decline, replaced by other towns that are on the railway line. At the 2011 census, Hartley had a population of 299 people.

History

Hartley was formerly a judicial and administrative centre that had a busy courthouse. The courthouse was built in 1837 and was designed by prominent New South Wales Colonial Architect Mortimer Lewis. The courthouse, which operated for over fifty years, dealt with a constant stream of robbers, thieves and convicts. Although Hartley fell into disuse, it survived as a perfectly preserved village that is a superb example of 19th century architecture. Because of its heritage value, it is now preserved as a historic site, administered by the National Parks and Wildlife Service of New South Wales.

Hartley's sister villages, Little Hartley and Hartley Vale, still survive as residential villages with a heritage of their own. There is also a network of historic walking tracks between Hartley Vale and Mount York, administered by the Lands Department of New South Wales.

Heritage listings
Hartley has a number of heritage-listed sites, including:
 Great Western Highway: Hartley historic site
 200 Jenolan Caves Road: Military Station archaeological site
 The Old Bathurst Road: Cox's Road and Early Deviations - Hartley, Clarence Hilly Range and Mount Blaxland Precinct

See also
 River Lett

Gallery

References

External links

Hartley Historic Site - NSW Parks & Wildlife Service
Hartley Historic Village - history and visiting information
National Parks and Wildlife Service of New South Wales

 
Towns in New South Wales
Communities in the Blue Mountains (New South Wales)